is a member of the Japanese Communist Party, serving in the House of Representatives. She is one of the representatives representing the Tokyo proportional representation block. She thinks that the government should do more to protect the rights of LGBT people.

References

1982 births
Living people
Female members of the House of Representatives (Japan)
Members of the House of Representatives (Japan)
Japanese Communist Party politicians